Palo Alto Plantation may refer to:
Palo Alto Plantation (Donaldsonville, Louisiana)
Palo Alto Plantation (Palopato, North Carolina)